The women's shot put event at the 1978 Commonwealth Games was held on 8 August at the Commonwealth Stadium in Edmonton, Alberta, Canada.

Results

References

Final results (The Canberra Times)

Athletics at the 1978 Commonwealth Games
1978